Taylor Red (formerly Red Roots) is an American country music red-haired identical triplet sisters trio from Wade, Mississippi. They started making music in 2010, with their first studio album, Red Roots, that was independently released by Red Hen Records, in 2011. Their second release, The Middle of Nowhere, a studio album, released in 2012, with Red Hen Records. The third studio album, Triplicity, was released in 2014, from Red Hen Records. The trio signed with Inpop Records, in 2015. In 2018, the band formally changed its name from Red Roots to Taylor Red.

The bands' triplets are singers, songwriters, composers, and multi-instrumentalists who play guitar, banjo, fiddle, and mandolin. The other brand partners include Frito-Lay, Wrangler, Lipton, Shein, Sprouts Farmers Market, Alka Seltzer, First Aid Beauty, PopSockets, and Ursa Major.

Background
Taylor Red is an identical red-haired triplet sister trio from Wade, Mississippi, born on March 18, 1991.

Music history
The sister trio started as a musical entity in 2011, with their first independently released album, Red Roots, that was released on January 24, 2011, with Red Hen Records. Their subsequent studio album, The Middle of Nowhere, was released on March 20, 2012, by Red Hen Records. They released, Triplicity, the third studio album, on January 7, 2014, from Red Hen Records alongside Daywind Music. The group was signed to Inpop Records in 2015.

Taylor Red released  track Country Money in March 2021. It was produced by Ilya Toshinsky and written by J.T. Harding, Matt Jenkins, and Andrew DeRoberts. The track was added to Spotify Editorial playlists and went viral on TikTok.

Taylor Red was featured in the national Sonic Drive-In campaign commercials for 2020-2021. The trio performed over 1,000 live shows across America and internationally in countries such as Norway and Canada, opening for acts including Amy Grant, Charlie Daniels, Diamond Rio, Don Williams, High Valley, Josh Turner, and Michael W. Smith.

Members

 Natalie Jean Taylor – vocals, mandolin, violin, bass
 Nika Lea Taylor – vocals, guitar, banjo
 Nicole Helen Taylor – vocals, guitar, banjo

Discography
Studio Albums
Red Roots (January 24, 2011, Red Hen)
The Middle of Nowhere (March 20, 2012, Red Hen)
Triplicity (January 7, 2014, Red Hen/Daywind)

References

External links

American Christian musical groups
2010 establishments in Mississippi
Inpop Records artists
Musical groups established in 2010
Triplets
Country music groups from Mississippi
American musical trios
Sibling musical trios
American bluegrass music groups
Families from Mississippi